Don Domingo Ordoñana (1829-1897), was a prominent rancher in Soriano Department in Uruguay.

Patron of national commemorations

He was noted for patronizing works of national commemorative importance. These include a memorial obelisk to the landing of the Thirty-Three Orientals at Agraciada Beach.

He also hosted at his Casa Blanca ranch the distinguished artist Juan Manuel Blanes during the latter's execution of his major work depicting the oath of the Thirty-Three Orientals.

Agricultural interests; death

Don Domingo was also noted for introducing various schemes of agricultural improvement.

He died in 1897 during a voyage to Spain.

See also

 Thirty-Three Orientals#Landing
 Juan Manuel Blanes#Works of Uruguayan national importance

References

Uruguayan people of Basque descent
History of Uruguay
Uruguayan cattlemen
1829 births
1897 deaths